is a station on the Tama Toshi Monorail Line in Hachiōji, Tokyo, Japan.

Lines
Ōtsuka-Teikyō-Daigaku Station is a station on the Tama Toshi Monorail Line and is located 14.3 kilometers from the terminus of the line at Kamikitadai Station.

Station layout
Ōtsuka-Teikyō-Daigaku Station is a raised station with two tracks and two opposed side platforms, with the station building located underneath. It is a standardized station building for this monorail line.

Platforms

History
The station opened on 10 January 2000.

Station numbering was introduced in February 2018 with Ōtsuka-Teikyō-Daigaku being assigned TT03.

Surrounding area
The station serves the nearby Ōtsuka campus of Teikyō University, though it is approximately a kilometer away. Other points of interest include:
 Ōtsuka-Teikyō-Daigaku-Mae Post Office
 OK Store supermarket, Tama-Ōtsuka branch
 Yaen-Kaidō (Tokyo Metropolitan Route 20)
 Festa Resort Yaen hotel (the former "Hotel Yaen" love hotel)

References

External links

 Tama Monorail Ōtsuka-Teikyō-Daigaku Station 

Railway stations in Japan opened in 2000
Railway stations in Tokyo
Tama Toshi Monorail
Hachiōji, Tokyo